Warmi Mach'ay (Quechua warmi woman, mach'ay cave, "woman cave", Hispanicized spelling Huarmimachay) is a mountain in the Andes of Peru, about  high. It is situated in the Huancavelica Region, Huancavelica Province, Acobambilla District, and in the Junín Region, Huancayo Province, Chongos Alto District. Warmi Mach'ay lies between the lakes named Warmiqucha in the southeast and Quylluqucha in the northwest.

References

Mountains of Huancavelica Region
Mountains of Junín Region
Mountains of Peru